The 2018 Nadkarni Cup is the 111th season of the Nadkarni Cup, a football competition played in Mumbai, a city in the Indian state of Maharashtra. The 16 teams will play the tournament on knockout cum basis. The matches will be played at RCF Ground, Chembur. The cup will commence from 6 February 2018.

Fixtures and Results

First round

Quarterfinals

Semifinals

Finals

Top scorers

References

MDFA Elite Division
2017–18 in Indian football